Cristian Demuro (born 7 July 1992) is an Italian jockey who competes in Flat racing. Demuro is now based in France and is noted for his major race wins on in the Prix du Jockey Club and Prix de l'Arc de Triomphe riding Sottsass. He is currently a first jockey for trainer Jean-Claude Rouget. He was champion jockey in Italy in 2011 and 2012. His elder brother  also as a jockey, currently based in Japan.

Major wins
 France
 Prix de l'Arc de Triomphe - (1) - Sottsass (2020)
 Prix du Jockey Club - (2) - Brametot (2017), Sottsass (2019)
 Poule d'Essai des Poulains - (2) - Brametot (2017), Olmedo (2018)
 Prix de Diane - (1) - La Cressonniere (2016)
 Poule d'Essai des Pouliches - (2) -  La Cressonniere (2016), Coeursamba (2021)
 Prix Ganay - (1) - Sottsass (2020)
 Prix Jean Romanet - (1) - Grand Glory (2021)
 Prix Saint Alary - (1) - Tawkeel (2020)
 Grand Prix de Paris - (1) - Helene Charisma (2016)

 Italy
 Gran Premio di Milano - (1) - Biz The Nurse (2013)
 Gran Premio del Jockey Club - (1) - Ventura Storm (2016)

 Japan
 Oka Sho - (1) - Ayusan (2013)
 Hopeful Stakes - (1) - Time Flyer (2017)
 Hanshin Juvenile Fillies - (1) - Danon Fantasy (2018)
 Queen Elizabeth II Cup  - (1) - Geraldina (2022)

 United Arab Emirates
 Dubai Sheema Classic - (1) - Shahryar (2022)

References

1992 births
Living people
Italian jockeys